James Katsuyuki Taenaka (妙中克之 Taenaka Katsuyuki; born November 27, 1964), better known as Jimmy T, is an American film and television actor.
He starred opposite the late Brandon Lee in 
Showdown in Little Tokyo (1991) as well as David Carradine and Daryl Hannah in Kung Fu Killer (2008).

Early life
Taenaka was born in Fort Ord, California and raised in Monterey, California. His parents had immigrated from Osaka, Japan. He attended Monterey High School in Monterey, California. Taenaka was a USA Junior National Judo Champion, and represented California at USA Junior National Wrestling Championships.

Career
Taenaka appears on television and film both in Asia and the United States. In Singapore, he starred in the epic World War II television drama, A War Diary about the Japanese occupation of Singapore, where he also received a nomination at the Asian Television Awards in 2002 for Best Drama Performance by an Actor.

Personal life
Taenaka is married to Lim Li Li.

Filmography

Film
Banting (2014)
Dead Mine (2012) HBO Asia
Tiger Team-The Mountain of 1000 Dragons (2010) Sony Pictures
Ovunque Tu Sia (2008) RAI International
Dance of the Dragon (2008)
L'Empire du Tigre (2005) TF1
The Second Singapore Short Story (2004)
Tequila - the Movie (2002)
Fatal Blade (2001)
Looking Italian (1998)
Psycho Sushi (1997)
The Low Life (1995)
The Shadow (1994) Universal Pictures
American Yakuza (1993)
Showdown in Little Tokyo (1991a) Warner Brothers

Television
 Glória (2021 TV series) Netflix Original Series
Grisse (2018) HBO Asia Series
Halfworlds (2017) HBO Asia Season 2 (Guest Star)
Silo (2017) meWATCH Originals Series
BRA (2017) MediaCorp TV Series
The Pupil (2010) MediaCorp TV Series
Kung Fu Killer (2008) TV Mini-Series RHI Entertainment
Calefare (2008) MediaCorp TV Series (Guest Star)
En Bloc (TV series) (2008) MediaCorp TV Series
First Mums (2005) MediaCorp TV Series
Shooting Stars (2005) MediaCorp TV Series
The Second Singapore Short Story (2004) MediaCorp TV Series
Daddy's Girls (2004) MediaCorp TV Episode
Machine (2004) MediaCorp TV Movie
Like My Own (2004) MediaCorp TV Series
Singapore Shakes (2004) TV Movie
Rouge (2004) MTV Asia - TV Episode
Amnesia (2003) MediaCorp TV Movie
One Peep Too Many (2002) TV Movie
A War Diary (2001) MediaCorp TV Series
Making Love (2000) MediaCorp TV Series
Martial Law (1999) TV Episode CBS
Brooklyn South (1998) TV Episode CBS
JAG (1997) TV Episode CBS
Cop Files (1993) TV Episode Fox TV

Hosting
Get Drunk In China (2007) Channel News Asia TV Series

References

External links

Jimmy T's official blog
 

1964 births
American male film actors
American male television actors
American male actors of Japanese descent
American film actors of Asian descent
American expatriates in Singapore
Living people